"You Took All the Ramblin' Out of Me" is a song written and recorded by American country artist Jerry Reed. It was released in December 1972 as the only single from the album, Hot a'Mighty. The song reached peaks of number 18 on the U.S. country chart  and number 8 on the Canadian RPM Country Tracks chart. The song was featured as part of the soundtrack to the video game Grand Theft Auto V, appearing on the in-game country music radio station Rebel Radio.

Chart performance

References

1972 singles
Jerry Reed songs
Songs written by Jerry Reed
Song recordings produced by Chet Atkins
1972 songs
RCA Records singles